Lycoteuthis lorigera is a species of squid in the genus Lycoteuthis. They grow up to 8 cm in length.

References

Squid
Molluscs described in 1875